Bank Street may refer to:

Bank Street (Ottawa)
Bank Street (football ground), Manchester, England
Bank Street (Manhattan)
Bank Street, Hyderabad
Bank Street (Hong Kong)
Bank Street, Worcestershire, a village
 Bank Street in Kilmarnock, Scotland
 Bank Street in the Downtown New London Historic District, Connecticut
 Bank Street in the Downtown Fall River Historic District, Massachusetts
 Bank Street in Cincinnati, location of the Bank Street Grounds
Bank Street College of Education or its Bank Street School for Children 
 Bank Street is a northern continuation of George Street, Dunedin, New Zealand